Irma Pane is an Indonesian American pop singer.

Biography
Irma Pane was born to Maj. Gen.TNI Timoer Pane and Nurlina Lubis in Bandung, Indonesia. She graduated from SMA 3 Bandung and studied classic voice/technique at Radio Republic Indonesia. She has resided in Potomac, Maryland since 1996. Her 1979 album, Irma Pane Volume II, made Top 10 lists.

Discography
Irma Pane Volume I (1977, Purnama Records)
Irma Pane Volume II (1979, Purnama Records)
Haruskah (1997, IPB Disc)

References

External links
http://www.irmapane.com/

Living people
Indonesian emigrants to the United States
20th-century Indonesian women singers
Indonesian pop singers
Musicians from West Java
People from Bandung
Year of birth missing (living people)